Twenty One Hours is a 2022 Indian thriller bilingual film directed by Jaishankar Pandit in his directorial debut. The Film stars   Dhananjay, Durga Krishna, Sudev Nair, Rahul Madhav in the lead roles. The film is shot in both Kannada and Malayalam

Cast 

 Dhananjay as Srikanth
 Durga Krishna as Madhuri Menon
 Sudev Nair as Renjith Menon
 Rahul Madhav
 Poorna Chandra
 Apoorva Bharadwaj
 Dinesh Babu
 Shweta Sanjeevulu

Soundtrack

Release 
The Film was released on 20 May 2022.

References

External links

2022 films
Indian thriller films
2022 thriller films